The Elephant Keeper is a 1987 Thai drama film directed by Chatrichalerm Yukol. The film was selected as the Thai entry for the Best Foreign Language Film at the 62nd Academy Awards, but was not accepted as a nominee.

Cast
 Sorapong Chatree as Boonsong

See also
 List of submissions to the 62nd Academy Awards for Best Foreign Language Film
 List of Thai submissions for the Academy Award for Best Foreign Language Film

References

External links
 

1987 films
1987 drama films
Thai drama films
Thai-language films